São Jerônimo is a municipality in the state of Rio Grande do Sul, Brazil. 

São Jerônimo may also refer to:
 São Jerônimo da Serra, a municipality in Paraná, Brazil
 São Jerônimo River (Pinhão River tributary), a river in Paraná, Brazil
 São Jerônimo River (Tibagi River tributary), a river in Paraná, Brazil

See also
 Saint Jerome (disambiguation)
 San Jerónimo (disambiguation)